Behrang–Tanjung Malim Highway, Federal Route 193 (formerly Perak state route 124 and state route 121 (Behrang Ulu–Tanjung Malim side)), is a major highway in Perak, Malaysia. The 13.2 km (8.2 mi) federal highway connects Behrang in the north to Tanjung Malim in the south. It also acts as a bypass for the Tanjung Malim town and Tanjung Malim–Slim River Highway (Federal Route 1).

The kilometre zero of the Federal Route 193 starts at Tanjung Malim. The Kilometre Zero monument is erected near Pos Malaysia post office at Jalan Ketoyong, Tanjung Malim.

Features

Proton City

At most sections, the Federal Route 193 was built under the JKR R5 road standard, allowing maximum speed limit of up to 90 km/h.

Overlaps: Behrang Ulu–Tanjung Malim:  Jalan Slim

No alternate routes or sections with motorcycle lanes.

List of interchanges

References

Highways in Malaysia
Malaysian Federal Roads